Hypsopygia moramangalis is a species of snout moth in the genus Hypsopygia. It was described by Hubert Marion and Pierre Viette in 1956 and is known from Madagascar.

References

Moths described in 1956
Pyralini
Moths of Madagascar
Moths of Africa